The Savanna swamp shrew (Crocidura longipes) is a species of mammal in the family Soricidae. It is endemic to Nigeria.  Its natural habitat is swamp.

References
 Hutterer, R. 2004.  Crocidura longipes.   2006 IUCN Red List of Threatened Species.   Downloaded on 30 July 2007.

Specific

Mammals of West Africa
Crocidura
Endemic fauna of Nigeria
Mammals described in 1983
Taxonomy articles created by Polbot